Lay-e Farashahi (also Romanized as Lāy-e Farāshāhī) is a village in Pishkuh Rural District, in the Central District of Taft County, Yazd Province, Iran. At the 2006 census, its population was 23, in 6 families.

References 

Populated places in Taft County